Fate of the Sky Raiders is a 1982 role-playing game adventure for Traveller published by FASA.

Plot summary
Fate of the Sky Raiders is the conclusion of the saga that began in the adventures Legend of the Sky Raiders and Trail of the Sky Raiders, in which players will finally get to meet the legendary Sky Raiders and learn what became of them.

Publication history
Fate of the Sky Raiders was written by J. Andrew Keith and William H. Keith Jr. and was published in 1982 by FASA as a digest-sized 60-page book with a two-color map.

Reception
William A. Barton reviewed Fate of the Sky Raiders in The Space Gamer No. 60. Barton commented that "even though Trail remains my personal favorite of the trilogy, Fate of the Sky Raiders is a thorough piece of work and should satisfy most referees and players as a fitting conclusion to the saga of the Sky Raiders."

Reviews
 Different Worlds #35 (July/Aug., 1984)

References

Role-playing game supplements introduced in 1982
Traveller (role-playing game) adventures